Terciman or Tercüman (means "The Translator") was a Pan-Turkist newspaper published between 1883 and 1918 by Crimean Tatar intellectual and educator Ismail Gasprinsky in Bakhchysarai. It was the first Crimean Tatar newspaper, and the main newspaper of Turkic peoples in Russian Empire.

In 1906-1911 Gasprinskiy also published a Crimean Tatar magazine Alem-i Nisvan oriented towards women. 

In the aftermath of the Russian February Revolution Terciman supported Crimean Tatar political movement. The newspaper was closed soon after Crimean People's Republic was occupied by Red Army in February 1918.

References 

1883 establishments
1918 disestablishments
Crimean culture
Crimean society